Pine Village is a town in Adams Township, Warren County, in the U.S. state of Indiana. The population was 217 at the 2010 census.

History
The town was founded at the location of a trading post called Pine Village, which may have been named for a lone pine tree that stood on the bluff of Pine Creek, or it may have been named for the creek itself. The town was laid out in 1851 by Isaac and John R. Metsker, and the plat map was made by county surveyor Perrin Kent.  The Methodist Church was already there; it was built several years earlier.

The post office at Pine Village has been in operation since 1854.

Rail service
Rail service reached the town in the 1870s. The line was later part of the Chicago and Eastern Illinois Railroad. It came to be known as the "Coal Road" for the large quantities of coal transported along it. When the C&EI floundered in the early 1920s, Charles F. Propst purchased the Coal Road and in October 1922 incorporated it as the Chicago, Attica and Southern Railroad. The CA&S was placed in receivership on August 5, 1931, and incremental abandonment occurred over subsequent years. The line through Pine Village was scrapped in the fall of 1945, and the rails were pulled up using a Belgian horse and a block and tackle.

Professional football
During the mid-1910s, Pine Village hosted a prominent professional football team.

Geography

Pine Village is located at the intersection of State Road 55 and State Road 26, near Big Pine Creek.

Demographics

As of the 2010 United States Census, there were 143 people, 60 households, and 41 families residing here. The racial makeup was 98.6% white, 0.7% black or African American, 0.0% from other races, and 0.7% from two or more races. Those of Hispanic or Latino origin made up 0.7% of the population. In terms of ancestry, 32.8% were German, 13.9% were Swedish, 11.5% were Irish, 9.8% were American, and 9.8% were English.

Of the 60 households, 26.7% had children under the age of 18 living with them, 55.0% were married couples living together, 8.3% had a female householder with no husband present, 31.7% were non-families, and 28.3% of all households were made up of individuals. The average household size was 2.38 and the average family size was 2.85. The median age was 46.1 years.

The median income for a household was $48,750 and the median income for a family was $62,083. Males had a median income of $58,750 versus $36,250 for females. The per capita income for was $26,957. About 17.4% of families and 17.2% of the population were below the poverty line, including 0.0% of those under age 18 and 0.0% of those age 65 or over.

References

Towns in Indiana
Towns in Warren County, Indiana
Populated places established in 1851
1851 establishments in Indiana